The GR 56 is a hiking trail in southeast Belgium from St. Vith to Malmedy. The approximately 200 km long trail is part of the GR long-distance hiking trail network (France, Belgium, the Netherlands and Spain).  The GR 56 was one of the first GR long-distance trails in Belgium and is traditionally marked in white and red stripes.

The GR trail 56 leads from St. Vith to Malmedy. The route from Sankt Vith, via  Hohe Venn to Monschau, through the Belgian nature park  Eifel to Burg-Reuland. The minimum distance of the entire route is 164 km  and the longest around the 200 km.

In 2011, the GR 56 was extended by two cross-links through the Amblève and Warche-valley.

Literature 
 Topo Guide GR 56

References

GR 56